Natural Babe Killers is a live compilation album recorded by Babes in Toyland. The album consists of alternate versions of previously released tracks, as well various previously unreleased material. It was released by Recall Records.

Track listing (disc one)
 "Bruise Violet"
 "Won't Tell"
 "Jungle Train"
 "We Are Family"
 "Big Top"
 "Magick Flute"
 "Memory"
 "Dogg"
 "Fork Down Throat"

Track listing (disc two)
 "Mad Pilot"
 "Ripe"
 "Ya Know That Guy"
 "Spun"
 "Primus"
 "Sweet '69"
 "Hubble Bubble Toil and Trouble"
 "Fair Is Foul and Foul Is Fair"
 "Fleshcrawl"

Babes in Toyland (band) compilation albums
1994 compilation albums
Recall Records albums
2000 compilation albums